Ficus gomelleira is a species of flowering plant, a tree in the family Moraceae. This species is monoecious.

Through the 1950s to the 1990s this species was widely viewed as the iroko tree.  

The tree can have a size up to 40 m, with a diameter that can reach up to 150 cm or more.

Names 
The species goes by several common names. In Peru it is called Ojé Renaco, Renaco, or Ojé, while in Brazil it is called Caxinguba, Figuier, or Figueira.

Occurrence 
The species is native to Bolivia, Brazil, Colombia, Ecuador, Guyana, Peru, Suriname, Trinidad-Tobago, and Venezuela.

References 

gomelleira
Flora of South America